Vasily Pavlovich Zubov (Васи́лий Па́влович Зу́бов, 1 August 1900 – 8 April 1963) was a Russian and Soviet philosopher who wrote on architecture, art, and the history of science based on studies of texts from the Middle Ages and Renaissance. He received a posthumous George Sarton medal from the history of science society in 1963.

Zubov was born in Alexandrov near Moscow to Pavel Vasilyevich, a chemist who had worked on thermo-chemistry, who also took an interest in playing the violin and in numismatics. Zubov studied classical languages and philosophy graduating from Moscow University in 1922. He joined the State Academy of Artistic Sciences where he contributed to an encyclopedia of art from 1923 to 1929. He examined architecture during this period, and in 1946 he submitted a doctoral thesis on Leon Battista Alberti's architectural theory, translating De re aedificatoria into Russian. After the war he studied the history of science at the Soviet Academy of Sciences, working there until his death. One of his major works was on Leonardo da Vinci published in 1961 which was translated into English. Zubov did not believe in theories (Geistesgeschichte) that people of a period stuck to specific approaches or traditions.

References 

1900 births
1963 deaths
Historians of science